Mary Lou is a 1948 American musical film starring Robert Lowery. The film featured Lynn Sousa, granddaughter of John Philip Sousa.

Plot

Cast
Robert Lowery as Steve Roberts
Joan Barton as Ann Parker
Glenda Farrell as Winnie Winford
Abigail Adams as Mary Lou
Frank Jenks as Mike Connors
Emmett Vogan as Murry Harris
Thelma White as Eve Summers
Pierre Watkin as Airline president

Production
The film was announced in June 1947.

References

External links

Review of film at Variety

1948 films
1948 musical films
American black-and-white films
Columbia Pictures films
American musical films
Films directed by Arthur Dreifuss
1940s American films